Ophthalmic pathology is the subspecialty of surgical pathology and also a subspecialty of ophthalmology which deals with the diagnosis and characterization of neoplastic and non-neoplastic diseases of the eyes. Ophthalmic pathologists generally work closely with ophthalmologists.

References

Anatomical pathology